The Dragon Lives, also known as He's a Legend, He's a Hero, is a 1976 Hong Kong martial arts film starring Bruce Li and directed by Wang Hsing-lei (credited as Singloy Wang). A fictional account of Bruce Lee's life, it is one of numerous films which exploited the popularity of Lee after his death, a practice called Bruceploitation. The film was released in the United States by Film Ventures International on 19 September 1978.

The film has often been mistaken for Bruce Lee: The Man, The Myth, another 1976 film depicting Bruce Lee's life and starring Bruce Li.

Cast
Ho Chung-tao (Bruce Li) as Bruce Lee
Caryn White as Lin, Bruce's wife
Chen Pei-zhen (Betty Chen) as Betty Ting Pei
Ernest 'Curt' Curtis as Sam Curtis, a boxer
Joe Nerbonne
Fred Cargle
Lee Wan-chung (Li Won Chung) as Raymond Chow, a film producer
Elton Hugee
Jim Burnett
Kjell Wallen
Mark Ruth
Jack Nickelson
Su Hsiang as Lo Wei, a film director
Hsieh Han as swordsman in film-shooting
Yam Ho as Bruce's friend

Release
The Dragon Lives was released in Hong Kong on 7 October 1976. In the United States, the film was released by Film Ventures International on 19 September 1978.

Critical response
Poll, a critic for the American film magazine Variety, criticized the technical deficiencies of The Dragon Lives ("cracking noises regularly precede the blows themselves.... characters appear in consecutive frames dressed differently"), but noted that its target audience is the least critical among moviegoers. The critic would also surmise that the film could have a short run in cinemas due to being less bloody than other Bruce Lee-inspired films.

Home media
The Dragon Lives was released on DVD in the United States on 12 March 2002.

References

External links

1976 films
1970s martial arts films
Bruceploitation films
Hong Kong martial arts films
1970s Hong Kong films
1980s Hong Kong films